Zavodsky City District is the name of several city divisions in Russia.
 Zavodsky City District, Kemerovo, a city district of Kemerovo, the administrative center of Kemerovo Oblast
 Zavodsky City District, Novokuznetsk, a city district of Novokuznetsk, a city in Kemerovo Oblast

See also 
 Zavodskoy (disambiguation)
 Zavodsky (disambiguation)

References